The Samsung Galaxy Tab 2 10.1 is a 10.1-inch Android-based tablet computer produced and marketed by Samsung Electronics. It belongs to the second generation of the Samsung Galaxy Tab series, which also includes a 7-inch model, the Galaxy Tab 2 7.0. It was announced on 25 February 2012, and launched in the US on 13 May 2012. It is the successor to the Samsung Galaxy Tab 10.1.

History 
The Galaxy Tab 2 10.1 was announced on 25 February 2012. It was shown along with the Galaxy Tab 2 7.0 at the 2012 Mobile World Conference. Although the two devices were originally scheduled to launch in March, they did not do so, with Samsung explaining that the delay was due to unspecified problems with Ice Cream Sandwich  Samsung later confirmed that the Galaxy Tab 2 10.1 would be released in the US on 13 May, with a price of $399.99 for the 16GB model.

Software 
The Galaxy Tab 2 10.1 was originally released with Android 4.0.3 Ice Cream Sandwich including apps from Google and Samsung and the Samsung TouchWiz UX app launcher. From September 2013 Samsung released an upgrade to Android 4.2.2 Jelly bean, both as an over-the-air (OTA) update and through Samsung Kies.

Hardware 
The Galaxy Tab 2 10.1 is available in WiFi-only and 3G & WiFi variants. Storage ranges from 16 GB to 32 GB depending on the model, with a microSDXC card slot for expansion. It has a 10.1-inch PLS LCD screen with a resolution of 1280x800 pixel. It also features a VGA front camera without flash and 3.2 MP rear-facing camera. It also has the ability to record HD videos. It also has a 30-pin dock connector.

References

External links
 

Samsung Galaxy Tab series
Android (operating system) devices
Tablet computers introduced in 2012
Tablet computers